The 68th Armor Regiment is an armored regiment of the United States Army. It was first activated in 1933 in the Regular Army as the 68th Infantry Regiment (Light Tanks).

Lineage

The regiment was originally constituted on 9 July 1918 in the Regular Army as the 68th Infantry Regiment, and assigned to the 9th Division. It was organized in July 1918 at Camp Sheridan, Alabama, from personnel of the 46th Infantry Regiment. It did not go overseas before the end of the war, and was relieved from the 9th Division and demobilized 15 February 1919 at Camp Sheridan. The 68th Infantry was reconstituted on 1 October 1933 in the Regular Army as the 68th Infantry (Light Tanks), allotted to the 6th Corps area, and activated as a Regular Army Inactive (RAI) unit at Peoria, Illinois, manned with Organized Reserve personnel. On 7 April 1937, the headquarters location was changed to Chicago, Illinois. The 1st and 2nd Battalions were activated on 1 January 1940 at Fort Benning, Georgia, less Reserve personnel, by redesignation of the 1st through 7th Tank Companies of the 1st through 7th Divisions. The inactive elements of the regiment were withdrawn from the Sixth Corps Area and allotted to the Fourth Corps Area. On 30 May 1940, the 2nd Battalion was transferred to Fort Lewis, Washington. On 30 June 1940, the 1st Battalion was inactivated at Fort Benning. On 15 July 1940, the remaining active elements of the regiment were redesignated as the 68th Armored Regiment and assigned to the 2nd Armored Brigade of the 2nd Armored Division (United States)|2nd Armored Division. The regiment (less the 2d Battalion which was already active) was activated 1 August 1940 at Fort Benning, Georgia. When the structure of U.S. armored divisions was reorganized marly in 1942, the regiment was inactivated on 8 January 1942 at Fort Benning and relieved from assignment to the 2nd Armored Division. The 68th Armored Regiment was assigned on 15 February 1942 to the new 6th Armored Division and activated at Fort Knox, Kentucky.

1st Tank Company
Organized 7 June 1918 in the National Army in France as Company A, 327th Battalion, Tank Corps, American Expeditionary Force.
Redesignated 12 September 1918 as Company A, 345th Battalion, Tank Corps.
Reorganized and redesignated 8 January 1921 as the 1st Tank Company and allotted to the Regular Army
Assigned 1 April 1921 to the 1st Division
Relieved 16 October 1939 from assignment to the 1st Division
Consolidated 1 January 1940 with Company A, 68th Infantry and consolidated unit designated as Company A, 68th Infantry.
Inactivated 5 June 1940 at Fort Benning.
Redesignated 15 July 1940 as Company A, 68th Armored Regiment, and assigned to 2nd Armored Division.
Activated 1 August 1940 at Fort Benning.
See Regiment for further history

2nd Tank Company
Organized 7 June 1918 in the National Army in France as Company C, 327th Battalion, Tank Corps, AEF.
Redesignated 12 September 1918 as Company C, 345th Battalion, Tank Corps.
Reorganized and redesignated 8 January 1921 as the 2nd Tank Company and allotted to the Regular Army
Redesignated 1 January 1940 as Company D, 68th Infantry Regiment (Light Tanks).
Redesignated 15 July 1940 as Company D, 68th Armored Regiment, and assigned to the 2nd Armored Division.

3rd Tank Company
Organized April 1918 in the National Army at Camp Colt, Pennsylvania as Company A, 328th Battalion, Tank Corps
Reorganized and redesignated 8 January 1921 as the 3rd Tank Company, allotted to the Regular Army.
Redesignated 1 January 1940 as Company E, 68th Infantry (Light Tanks).
Redesignated 15 July 1940 as Company E, 68th Armored Regiment, and assigned to the 2nd Armored Division.

4th Tank Company
Organized April 1918 in the National Army at Camp Colt, Pennsylvania as Company C, 328th Battalion, Tank Corps
Reorganized and redesignated 8 January 1921 as the 4th Tank Company, allotted to the Regular Army, and assigned to the 4th Division)
Inactivated 27 September 1921 at Fort Lewis, Washington.
Activated 15 September 1931 at Fort McClellan, Alabama.
Redesignated 1 January 1940 as Company B, 68th Infantry (Light Tanks), and relieved from assignment to the 4th Division.
Inactivated 5 June 1940 at Fort Benning, Georgia
Redesignated 15 July 1940 as Company B, 68th Armored Regiment, and assigned to 2nd Armored Division.
Activated 1 August 1940 at Fort Benning.

5th and 6th Tank Companies
Organized 17 February 1918 as B Company (Provisional), Tank Service, American Expeditionary Force.
Redesignated 16 April 1918 in the National Army at Borg, France as Company B, 1st Tank Center, American Expeditionary Force.
Redesignated on 6 June 1918 as Company B, 326th Battalion, Tank Corps.
Redesignated 1 September 1918 as Company B, 344th Battalion, Tank Corps.
Reorganized and redesignated 8 January 1921 as the 5th Tank Company, allotted to the Regular Army.
Consolidated 1 January 1940 with the 6th Tank Company, and then reorganized and redesignated as Company C, 68th infantry Regiment
Inactivated 5 June 1940 at Fort Benning, Georgia.
Redesignated 15 July 1940 as Company C, 68th Armored Regiment, and assigned to 2nd Armored Division.
Activated 1 August 1940 at Fort Benning.

7th Tank Company
Organized 7 June 1918 as Company B, 327th Battalion, Tank Corps, American Expeditionary Force.
Redesignated 12 September 1918 as Company B, 345th Battalion, Tank Corps.
Reorganized and redesignated 8 January 1921 as the 2nd Tank Company, allotted to the Regular Army.
Inactivated 6 September 1921 at Camp Meade, Maryland.
Redesignated 1 January 1940 as Company F, 68th Infantry Regiment (Light Tanks), and activated at Fort Benning, Georgia.
Redesignated 15 July 1940 as Company F, 68th Armored Regiment, and assigned to 2nd Armored Division.

Company G, 68th Infantry Regiment (Light Tanks)
Constituted 1 October 1933 in the Regular Army as Company G, 68th Infantry Regiment (Light Tanks).
Redesignated 15 July 1940 as Company G, 68th Armored Regiment, and assigned to 2nd Armored Division.
Activated 13 August 1940 at Fort Benning.

Company H, 68th Infantry Regiment (Light Tanks)
Constituted 1 October 1933 in the Regular Army as Company G, 68th Infantry Regiment (Light Tanks).
Redesignated 15 July 1940 as Company G, 68th Armored Regiment, and assigned to 2nd Armored Division.
Activated 13 August 1940 at Fort Benning.

Armored regiment
(1st and 2nd Battalions activated 1 January 1940 at Fort Benning, Georgia, as Infantry Tank Battalions (See Above);
1st Battalion inactivated 30 June 1940 at Fort Benning, Georgia, (See Above).
Converted and redesignated 15 July 1940 as the 68th Armored Regiment and assigned to the 2d Armored Division.
Regiment (less the 2nd Battalion, which was already active) activated 1 August 1940 at Fort Benning, Georgia.
Inactivated 8 January 1942 at Fort Benning, Georgia, and relieved from assignment to the 2d Armored Division
Assigned 15 February 1942 to the 6th Armored Division and activated at Fort Knox, Kentucky
Moved to Camp Chaffee, Arkansas on 20 March 1942 for divisional training and maneuvers.
Moved to Camp Young, California on 12 October 1942 to train at the Desert Training Center.

Triangulation
Regiment broken up 20 September 1943 and its elements reorganized and redesignated as follows:
Regimental Headquarters and Headquarters Company and 2d Battalion as the 68th Tank Battalion and remained assigned to the 6th Armored Division
1st Battalion as the 773d Tank Battalion and relieved from assignment to the 6th Armored Division
3d Battalion as the 15th Tank Battalion and remained assigned to the 6th Armored Division
Reconnaissance Company as Troop D, 86th Cavalry Reconnaissance Squadron, Mechanized, and remained an element of the 6th Armored Division
Maintenance and Service Companies, and Band disbanded.

World War II

Troop D, 86th Cavalry Reconnaissance Squadron
Deployed from the New York Port of Embarkation on 11 February 1944.
Arrived in England on 23 February 1944.
Deployed further to France on 19 July 1944.
Was located at Kahla, Germany on 14 August 1945
Return to Boston Port of Embarkation on 18 September 1945

15th Tank Battalion
Deployed from the New York Port of Embarkation on 11 February 1944.
Arrived in England on 24 February 1944.
Further deployed to France on 22 July 1944
Located at Jena, Germany on 14 August 1945
Returned to the New York Port of Embarkation on 20 February 1946

68th Tank Battalion
Deployed from the New York Port of Embarkation on 11 February 1944.
Arrived in England on 24 February 1944.
Further deployed to France on 22 July 1944
Located at Buttstädt, Germany on 14 August 1945
Returned to the Hampton Roads Port of Embarkation on 29 December 1945

773rd Tank Battalion
Deployed from the San Francisco Port of Embarkation on 8 February 1944.
Arrived in Hawaii on 15 February 1944.
Further deployed to Saipan on 15 July 1944
Further deployed to Tinian on 24 July 1944
Returned to Hawaii on 17 August 1944
Further deployed to Hojaki Shima on 26 March 1945
Further deployed to Tokashiki Shima 27 March 1945
Further deployed to Keise Shima 31 March 1945
Further deployed to Ie Shima 27 March 1945
Inactivated 15 April 1946 in Japan

Reconsolidation
After 20 September 1943 the above units underwent changes that resulted in reconsolidation as follows:
68th Tank Battalion relieved 19 July 1945 from assignment to the 6th Armored DivisionInactivated 29 December 1945 at Camp Patrick Henry, VirginiaRedesignated 21 August 1950 as the 68th Medium Tank Battalion and assigned to the 6th Armored DivisionActivated 5 September 1950 at Fort Leonard Wood, MissouriInactivated 16 March 1956 at Fort Leonard Wood, MissouriRelieved 1 July 1957 from assignment to the 6th Armored Division.
773d Tank Battalion reorganized and redesignated 27 October 1943 as the 773d Amphibian Tank BattalionReorganized and redesignated 10 January 1944 as the 773d Amphibian Tractor BattalionInactivated 15 April 1946 in JapanRedesignated 24 December 1946 as the 56th Amphibian Tractor BattalionRedesignated 18 April 1949 as the 56th Amphibious Tank and Tractor BattalionActivated 10 May 1949 at Fort Worden, WashingtonInactivated 15 December 1954 at Fort Worden, Washington
15th Tank Battalion relieved 9 July 1945 from assignment to the 6th Armored DivisionInactivated 22 February 1946 – 25 February 1946 at Camp Kilmer, New Jersey.
Headquarters and Headquarters Company, 15th Tank Battalion, redesignated 1 August 1946 as 15th Tank Company, and activated at Fort Riley, KansasInactivated 6 November 1946 at Fort Riley, KansasActivated 1 June 1947 in ItalyInactivated 1 December 1949 in ItalyRedesignated 21 August 1950 as Headquarters, Headquarters and Service Company, 15th Medium Tank Battalion (organic elements of the 15th Tank Battalion redesignated as elements of the 15th Medium Tank Battalion), and assigned to the 6th Armored DivisionBattalion activated 5 September 1950 at Fort Leonard Wood, MissouriInactivated 16 March 1956 at Fort Leonard Wood, MissouriRelieved 1 July 1957 from assignment to the 6th Armored Division.
Troop D, 86th Cavalry Reconnaissance Squadron, Mechanized, inactivated 19 September 1945 at Camp Myles Standish, *MassachusettsRedesignated 21 August 1950 as Company D, 86th Reconnaissance Battalion, and remained an element of the 6th Armored DivisionActivated 5 September 1950 at Fort Leonard Wood, MissouriInactivated 16 March 1956 at Fort Leonard Wood, MissouriRelieved 1 July 1957 from assignment to the 6th Armored Division.
Maintenance and Service Companies, 68th Armored Regiment, reconstituted 1 July 1957 in the Regular Army
68th and 15th Medium Tank Battalions; 56th Amphibious Tank and Tractor Battalion; Company D, 86th Reconnaissance Battalion; and Maintenance and Service Companies, 68th Armored Regiment, consolidated, reorganized, and redesignated 1 July 1957 as the 68th Armor Regiment, a parent regiment under the Combat Arms Regimental System

Post World War II

Relieved 1 April 1963 from assignment to the 3d Infantry Division; concurrently redesignated as the 1st Battalion, 68th Armor, and assigned to the 8th Infantry Division.
Withdrawn 1 April 1984 from the Combat Arms Regimental System and reorganized under the United States Army Regimental System (USARS)
1st Battalion was inactivated 15 March 1991 in Germany and relieved from assignment to the 8th Infantry Division.
1st Battalion was assigned 16 January 1996 to the 4th Infantry Division and activated at Fort Carson, Colorado
3rd Battalion was assigned to the 4th Infantry Division at Fort Carson, CO in the 1980s and early 1990s.
4th Battalion was assigned to the 82nd Airborne Division from 22 March 1968 until 7 February 1984, when it was reflagged as the 3rd Battalion, 73rd Armor. Both units employed the M551 Sheridan.
Company A, 4th Battalion was reactivated on 26 October 2018 as part of the 82nd Airborne Division's 1st Brigade Combat Team, equipped with LAV-25A2s acquired from the U.S. Marine Corps and was inactivated on 25 September 2020. The company was a locally-raised provisional unit and its designation was not authorized by the Department of the Army.

Honors

Campaign participation credit
World War I:
Saint-Mihiel;
Meuse-Argonne

World War II:
Normandy;
Northern France;
Rhineland;
Ardennes-Alsace;
Central Europe;
Western Pacific (with arrowhead);
Ryukyu Islands (with arrowhead)

Korean War:
Korea, Summer 1953

Decorations
Presidential Unit Citation (Navy) for SAIPAN AND TINIAN

History of the Silver Lions
The 'Silver Lions" of 1st Battalion, 68th Armor Regiment, were the only armor battalion located on Fort Carson, with 48 M1A1 Abrams Main Battle Tanks, 32 Armored Personnel Carriers, Over 50 Tactical Wheeled vehicles, 5 Tracked Maintenance/Recovery vehicles and over 600 personnel. 1–68 Armor had 4 Companies (HHC, A, B, and C), with 14 M1A1 Main Battle Tanks in each Line Company (A, B, and C).  To Support the 3 line Companies there was Headquarters and Headquarters Company (HHC), the largest of the four Companies with over 300 personnel.  Located in HHC were platoons of Cavalry Reconnaissance, Mortar, Maintenance, Headquarters, Signal, Supply, Intelligence, Cooks, Chemical, Administration and Medics for the Battalion.

Before the Force 21 Concept, 1st Battalion, 68th Armor had 5 companies (HHC, A, B, C and D). On 13 April 2000, A Company was deactivated, turning all 14 tanks to the Mississippi National Guard. D Company was deactivated on 14 April 2000 and re-flagged as A Company, leaving the battalion with the standard four companies, rather than five.

Current organization of 1–68 
Upon return from deployment to OIF 1, the 4th Infantry Division immediately began reorganization into the "modular brigade" structure of the new U.S. Army.  4th Infantry Division was again deployed to OIF in late 2005, replacing 3rd ID in Baghdad. The 3rd Brigade was attached to the 101st and the 1–68 was sent to Baqubah, Iraq.

After being reorganized under the modular concept, the 1st Battalion, 68th Armor Regiment became known as the 1st Combined Arms Battalion, 68th Armor Regiment.  HHC, known as Hatchet, with scouts, snipers, mortars, medics and staff positions.  Alpha, known as Attack, and Bravo, known as Blackhawk, were designated as infantry companies with M2A3 Bradley fighting vehicles. Charlie company known as Cold Steel, and Delta, known as Destroyer, were set up as tank companies with 14 M1A2 Abrams main battle tanks each.  Echo Company, known as Exile company, as an engineering company.  Fox company, known as Forerunner, was attached from 64th Brigade Support Battalion to provide mess support, maintenance/recovery, and a supply distribution platoon. The final company is Golf Company, which is the rear-detachment company for the battalion when it is deployed.

The battalion's last Iraq deployment was to Basra, as a part of OIF 10–11.

Notable Members
 Jeffrey Dahmer - 1978 - 1981 - 2nd Battalion as a medic
 William Gainey - 1996 - Command Sergeant Major of the 2nd Battalion, 68th Armored Regiment. Went on to be appointed the first Senior Enlisted Advisor to the Chairman of the Joint Chiefs of Staff.

See also
 List of armored and cavalry regiments of the United States Army

Sources
 http://www.army/1-68ar.htm
 https://web.archive.org/web/20110224223811/http://www.carson.army.mil/units/4id/index.htm
 http://www.globalsecurity.org/military/agency/
USA Airborne - 50th Anniversary, Turner, 1990

References

068
Military units and formations established in 1933